The fourth season of the American police procedural television series FBI premiered on September 21, 2021, on CBS, for the 2021–22 television season, and ended on May 17, 2022.

FBI centers on inner workings of the New York office criminal division of the Federal Bureau of Investigation (FBI). The series features an ensemble cast including Missy Peregrym, Zeeko Zaki, Jeremy Sisto, Alana de la Garza, John Boyd and Katherine Renee Turner. The season consisted of 21 episodes

Cast and characters

Main
 Missy Peregrym as Maggie Bell, FBI Special Agent. She is the de facto agent in charge of the team while out in the field.
 Zeeko Zaki as Omar Adom "O.A." Zidan, FBI Special Agent and Maggie's partner, West Point graduate, and a retired Army Ranger Captain. 
 Jeremy Sisto as Jubal Valentine, FBI Assistant Special Agent-In-Charge (ASAC).
 Alana de la Garza as Special Agent in Charge (SAC) Isobel Castille, Mosier's replacement as the team's supervisor.
 John Boyd as Stuart Scola,Tiffany's field partner.
 Katherine Renee Turner as Tiffany Wallace, FBI Special Agent and a former NYPD officer and White Collar Division agent. She is Kristen's replacement.

Recurring
 James Chen as Ian Lim, an FBI Technical Analyst.
 Thomas Phillip O'Neil as Dr. Neil Mosbach, an FBI Medical Examiner.
 Taylor Anthony Miller as Kelly Moran, an FBI Analyst.
 Roshawn Franklin as Trevor Hobbs, an FBI Special Agent and an Intelligence Analyst.
 Vedette Lim as Elise Taylor, an FBI intelligence analyst.
 David Zayas as Antonio Vargas, the most notorious drug lord in the world and leader of the Durango Cartel.
 Kathleen Munroe as Rina Trenholm, FBI's Assistant Director in charge of the New York Field Office.
 Piter Marek as Rashid Bashir, FBI Special Agent In Charge of Counterterrorism
 Shantel VanSanten as Nina Chase, an FBI Special Agent who temporarily fills in for Maggie after she is exposed to sarin gas in the line of duty.

Episodes 

The number in the "No. overall" column refers to the episode's number within the overall series, whereas the number in the "No. in season" column refers to the episode's number within this particular season. "U.S. viewers (millions)" refers to the number of viewers in the U.S. in millions who watched the episode as it was aired.

Production 
On March 24, 2021, CBS renewed FBI for a fourth season.

Removed episode 
The original season finale, "Prodigal Son" was set as the 22 episode of the season. However, the episode had to be pulled from its planned airing on  due to the Robb Elementary School shooting that occurred the same day that the episode was supposed to air. As a result, episode 21 "Kayla" became the unofficial season finale.

Release 
The fourth season of FBI premiered on September 21, 2021. It aired on Tuesdays at 8:00 p.m. with its spin-off series FBI: Most Wanted and FBI: International.

Ratings

References 

2021 American television seasons
2022 American television seasons